Aodh Mag Uidhir, anglicised as Hugh Maguire (died 1600) was Chief of the Name of the Irish clan Maguire and Lord of Fermanagh during the reign of Elizabeth I. He died in battle resisting the Tudor conquest of Ireland as part of the Nine Years War.

Early career
Maguire's country was in the southern part of the province of Ulster, a terrain difficult of access as it was covered with forest, lakes and rivers. The crown authorities made sporadic attempts to subdue the clan, and in 1586 Maguire surrendered to the English and was pardoned in return for an agreement to pay 500 beeves to the crown, of which 200 were appropriated by the lord deputy, Sir John Perrot as his perquisite for proposing to make Maguire a captain of the country; this proposal was not carried through, even though Maguire had lodged three pledges for his loyalty in Dublin Castle.

In 1587 Maguire, along with Art O'Neill's forces, attacked and plundered a party of Scots which had invaded Down; on their return towards the river Erne, Maguire attacked O'Neill's men and killed and wounded many of them. In 1588 he was in league with Sir Brian O'Rourke, the Burkes and the Spanish following the wreckage of the Spanish Armada on the north and west coasts of Ireland. Thereafter, he was implicated in the plot of Hugh O'Neill, 2nd Earl of Tyrone, to murder Con MacShane O'Neill, who petitioned the lord deputy, Sir William Fitzwilliam for protection.

Lord of Fermanagh
In 1589 Maguire succeeded his father and inherited lands in Fermanagh with a retreat in the islands of Lough Erne which he considered impregnable. He retorted to Fitzwilliam's demand that he allow the queen's writ to run in his country: "Your sheriff shall be welcome but let me know his eric [ie. honour price] that if my people should cut his head off I may levy it upon the country". His argument was that he had already paid 300 beeves to Fitzwilliam to keep the sheriff out. Nevertheless, Captain Willis was made sheriff in command of 100 men, and disaffected members of the clan were encouraged to defy Maguire. In 1590 Maguire drove the sheriff and his men into a church and besieged them there, whereupon Tyrone intervened to save the besieged from death. Fitzwilliam then invaded the country, proclaimed Maguire a traitor, and took Enniskillen.

Encouraged by the Catholic archbishop of Armagh, Edmund MacGauran, but opposed by Tyrone, Maguire invaded Connacht straight away and met with the army of Sir Richard Bingham, president of the province, on mid-summer eve. The battle of Sciath na Feart took place at Tulsk, in a fog so dense that the sides only realised their proximity when their cavalries were almost upon one another. Bingham's men fled to their camp, and Maguire pursued but was repulsed and in his turn pursued. The Irish lost MacGauran; the English lost William Clifford. Maguire retired into his country with considerable spoil.

At the end of 1593, Maguire was wounded in an attempt to prevent Sir Henry Bagenal and Tyrone from crossing the Erne. In June of the following year he besieged Enniskillen with Hugh Roe O'Donnell, Lord of Tyrconnell. Sir Henry Duke sought to relieve the garrison, but Maguire intercepted him at the Arney River and defeated him in the Battle of the Ford of the Biscuits (Beal atha na mBriosgaidh). In the following year he devastated Cavan and was again proclaimed a traitor by the English.

Nine Years War

During the Nine Years War (Ireland) (1595–1603), Maguire participated in the Battle of Clontibret in 1595, a significant early defeat for the English, and commanded the cavalry at Mullaghbrack in 1596. He sent in his submission to the government later in the year. 

In 1598, he held a command at the Battle of the Yellow Ford, at which Bagenal was slain and the English army annihilated. In 1599, he helped raid Thomond and took Inchiquin Castle, County Clare. 

In early 1600, he commanded Tyrone's cavalry in the Leinster and Munster campaigns. On 18 February, he was intercepted within a mile of Cork by Sir Warham St Leger. Maguire killed St Leger but died within a few hours of the encounter from the wounds he himself had sustained. His foster father, his priest, and all the commanders of his regiment were also killed.

Maguire's death was a blow to the rebel cause. He had educated and advanced notions of cavalry warfare; so too did St Leger, and their meeting was as much one of minds as of force.

Legacy
Maguire married Margaret O'Neill, the daughter of Tyrone, but was succeeded by his younger brother, Cuchonnacht. Following the breach of the terms of the Treaty of Mellifont by the Crown, Cuchonnacht departed Ireland for the continent with Tyrone during the Flight of the Earls in 1607, dying at Genoa in August 1608. 

Almost all of Fermanagh was confiscated by the crown after this and planted, largely by English settlers and lowland Scots, particularly border reivers (see Plantation of Ulster).

Maguire's bard, Eochaidh Ó hÉoghusa (O'Hussey in English), composed a stark and chilling ode upon his patron's death—some lines, translated by James Clarence Mangan centuries later:
Tho’ he were even a wolf ranging the round green woods,	
Tho’ he were even a pleasant salmon in the unchainable sea,	
Tho’ he were a wild mountain eagle, he could scarce bear, he,	         
This sharp sore sleet, these howling floods.

The Annals of the Four Masters (c. 1630) eulogised him: "He was the bulwark of valour and prowess, the shield of protection and shelter, the tower of support and defence, and the pillar of the hospitality and achievements of the Oirghialla and of almost all the Irish of his time".

In literature
 In his 1861 poem Eirinn a' Gul ("Ireland Weeping"), Uilleam Mac Dhunlèibhe, an important figure in 19th century Scottish Gaelic literature, recalled the many stories about his fellow Gaels in Inis Fáil (Ireland) he had heard in the Ceilidh houses of Islay, before that island was emptied by the Highland Clearances. He then lamented the destruction wreaked upon the Irish people by both famine and similar mass evictions ordered by Anglo-Irish landlords. He particularly laments the loss of the Chiefs of the Irish clans, who led their clansmen in war and provided "leadership of the old and true Gaelic kind". Mac Dhunlèibhe comments sadly that the mid-19th century fighters for Irish republicanism had none of the heroic qualities shown by Red Hugh O'Donnell, Hugh O'Neill, and Hugh Maguire during the Nine Years War against Queen Elizabeth I. Sadly, but expressing hope for the future of the Irish people, Mac Dhunlèibhe closes by asking where are the Irish clan warriors who charged out of the mist and slaughtered the armies of the Stranger at the Battle of the Yellow Ford and the Battle of Moyry Pass.

References

Sources
Richard Bagwell, Ireland under the Tudors 3 vols. (London, 1885–1890)
John O'Donovan (editor), Annals of Ireland by the Four Masters (1851)
Calendar of State Papers: Carew MSS. i., ii., (6 vols., 1867–1873)
Calendar of State Papers: Ireland
Nicholas Canny The Elizabethan Conquest of Ireland (1976); Kingdom and Colony (2002)
Hiram Morgan Tyrone's War (1995)
Cyril Falls Elizabeth's Irish Wars (1950; reprint London, 1996); 
Dictionary of National Biography 22 vols. (London, 1921–1922)

Year of birth unknown 
1600 deaths
16th-century Irish people
Irish lords
People of Elizabethan Ireland
People from County Fermanagh
Recipients of English royal pardons